New Winchester may refer to:

New Winchester, Indiana
New Winchester, Ohio (in Crawford County)
New Winchester, Licking County, Ohio, a ghost town